An over-the-top (OTT) media service is a media service offered directly to viewers via the Internet. OTT bypasses cable, broadcast, and satellite television platforms: the types of companies that have traditionally acted as controllers or distributors of such content. It has also been used to describe no-carrier cellphones, for which all communications are charged as data, avoiding monopolistic competition, or apps for phones that transmit data in this manner, including both those that replace other call methods and those that update software.

The term is most synonymous with subscription-based video on demand (SVoD) services that offer access to film and television content (including existing shows and movies for which rights have been acquired from the content owner, as well as original content produced specifically for the service).

OTT also encompasses a wave of "skinny" television services that offer access to live streams of linear specialty channels, similar to a traditional satellite or cable TV provider, but streamed over the public Internet, rather than a closed, private network with proprietary equipment such as set-top boxes.

Over-the-top services are typically accessed via websites on personal computers, as well as via apps on mobile devices (such as smartphones and tablets), digital media players (including video game consoles), or televisions with integrated Smart TV platforms.

Definitions
In 2011, the Canadian Radio-television and Telecommunications Commission (CRTC), Canada's telecom regulator, stated that it "considers that Internet access to programming independent of a facility or network dedicated to its delivery (via, for example, cable or satellite) is the defining feature of what has been termed 'over-the-top' services".

In contrast to video on demand video-delivery systems offered by cable and IPTV, which are tightly managed networks where channels can be changed instantly, some OTT services such as iTunes require that the video be downloaded first and then played, while other OTT players such as Netflix, Hulu, Peacock, Disney+, HBO Max, Discovery+, Paramount+, and Amazon Prime Video, offer movie downloads that start playing before the download completes (streaming).

The United States Federal Communications Commission (FCC) categorizes the OTT services into two groups: multichannel video programming distributors (MVPDs); and online video distributors (OVDs).

Virtual MVPDs include such varied services as DirecTV Stream, FuboTV, Sling TV, Hulu + Live TV, and YouTube TV.

The FCC defined an OVD as:

Background
In broadcasting, over-the-top (OTT) content is the audio, video, and other media content delivered over the Internet, without the involvement of a multiple-system operator (MSO) in the control or distribution of the content. The Internet provider may be aware of the contents of the Internet Protocol (IP) packets, and may be able to block or restrict their transit to end users (unless that internet provider operates within a jurisdiction that requires "net neutrality"), but is not responsible for the viewing abilities, copyrights, and/or other redistribution of the content. This model contrasts with the purchasing or rental of video or audio content from an Internet service provider (ISP), such as pay television, video on demand, and from internet protocol television (IPTV). OTT refers to content from a third party that is delivered to an end-user, with the ISP simply transporting IP packets.

Types of content

OTT television, usually called online television, Internet television or streaming television, remains the most popular OTT content. This signal is received over the Internet or through a cell phone network, as opposed to receiving the television signal from a terrestrial broadcast or satellite. The video distributor controls access through an app, a separate OTT dongle, or a box connected to a phone, PC, or smart television set. By mid-2017, 58 percent of US households would access one in a given month, and advertising revenues from OTT channels exceeded those from web browser plug-ins.

The record of simultaneous users watching an OTT event was set at 18.6 million by Disney's Indian video streaming platform Hotstar.

OTT messaging is defined as instant messaging services or online chat provided by third parties, as an alternative to text messaging services provided by a mobile network operator. An example is the Facebook-owned mobile application WhatsApp, that serves to replace text messaging on Internet connected smartphones. Other providers of OTT messaging include Viber, WeChat, iMessage, Skype, Telegram and the now defunct Google Allo.

OTT voice calling, usually called VoIP, capabilities, for instance, as provided by FaceTime, Skype, Viber, WhatsApp, WeChat, and Zoom use open internet communication protocols to replace and sometimes enhance existing operator controlled services offered by mobile phone operators.

Modes of access
Consumers can access OTT content through Internet-connected devices such as smartphones, tablets, smart TVs, set-top boxes, gaming consoles, and desktop and laptop computers. As of 2019, Android and iOS users make up more than 45% of the total OTT content streaming audience, while 39% of users use the web to access OTT content.

See also 

 Access-independent services
 Content delivery network
 Home theater PC
 Streaming television
 List of Internet television providers
 Multi-screen video
 Multichannel television in the United States
 Streaming media
 Over-the-top media services in India

References

Further reading
  Announcement of release Report.
 

Streaming television
Net neutrality
Set-top box